Beau Daniel Bennett (born November 27, 1991) is an American former professional ice hockey right winger. He last played with the Tucson Roadrunners of the American Hockey League (AHL) while under contract with the Arizona Coyotes of the National Hockey League (NHL).

Bennett attended the University of Denver until 2012. He was drafted into the National Hockey League (NHL) by the Pittsburgh Penguins in the first round, 20th overall, in the 2010 NHL Entry Draft. Bennett is the highest-drafted Californian born-and-trained player in NHL history and became the first California born-and-trained player to win the Stanley Cup when he won it as a member of the Penguins in 2016. However, his name was not engraved on the Cup due to not meeting NHL requirements for number of games played during the season.

Playing career

Minor
Bennett started out playing in-line hockey and made a transition to playing ice hockey full-time. He played in the 2003 and 2004 Quebec International Pee-Wee Hockey Tournaments with the Los Angeles Junior Kings.

Junior
Bennett committed in June 2009 to play for Penticton's British Columbia Hockey League (BCHL) team, the Penticton Vees. He chose Penticton over the Western Hockey League (WHL)'s Calgary Hitmen and the United States Hockey League (USHL)'s Tri-City Storm, the two teams owning his major junior and USHL playing rights, respectively. While only a rookie, Bennett was placed on the top forward line alongside team captain Denver Manderson at center and Alex Szczechura at left wing.

Bennett had an incredibly strong start to his season before being named to represent his country at the World Junior A Challenge. After contributing three goals and four points and winning a gold medal, Bennett returned to Penticton to record ten goals and ten assists in nine games. In December, he was named top forward at the Canadian Junior Hockey League (CJHL) prospects games in Winkler, Manitoba. In January, Bennett played in the BCHL All-Star Game.

Towards the end of the season, due to an injury to the top line's centerman, Denver Manderson, Bennett was switched to center, a position he had never played. He flourished in the position, and in the final regular season game, he scored four points to tie Mark Zengerle for the league scoring title with 120 points. (Bennett had 41 goals and 79 assists; Zengerle had 33 goals and 87 assists.)

In the Interior Conference Finals, the Vees were facing elimination by the opposing Vernon Vipers. The Vipers hosted Game 5, which went into triple overtime. After helping force a 2–2 tie by scoring a goal, Bennett set up the play that gave the Vees another chance at victory. After receiving a pass, he beat the Vipers' defenders and approached the right side of the net, followed-up by teammate Denver Manderson as well as Vernon defensemen. Feinting an attempt at a wraparound goal, he used a skillful backhand pass through his skates to Manderson that the Vernon goaltender, Graeme Gordon, did not notice. Making as though he still carried the puck, he swept around the back of the net, with Gordon following to cover his right (net's left) side of the net, leaving his left (net's right) wide open for Manderson to shoot the perfectly-placed puck into the net. Despite the Game 5 victory in overtime, however, the Vees went on to be defeated in the subsequent game 6.

Despite the less-than-perfect end to his season, Bennett was named the BCHL's Rookie of the Year, as well as the recipient of the Penticton Vees' Leading Scorer Award and the Rookie of the Year Award.

College
In his freshman year at the University of Denver, Bennett played 37 games for the Pioneers ice hockey team, scoring 25 points (nine goals and 16 assists). He recorded four multi-point games — two points in games against Bemidji State, Lake Superior State, Minnesota State and Alaska–Anchorage. He tallied six assists during a six-game point streak from March 4 through March 19, and added 98 hits and 15 blocked shots throughout the campaign. He missed five games, however, from December 4 through January 1 with a right knee injury.

In his sophomore year, Bennett played 10 games and scored 13 points (4 goals and 9 assists). He injured his wrist during practice on October 26 and missed four games, returning to the lineup on November 12. He recorded five points (two goals and three assists) in a four-game point streak from November 12 to 25. On December 8, 2011, Bennett had surgery to repair a ruptured tendon in his wrist. The injury forced him to miss the final 29 games of the season. He was named to the All-WCHA Academic Team.

On April 13, 2012, Bennett signed a three-year, entry-level contract with the Pittsburgh Penguins. Bennett finished his Denver career with 38 points on 13 goals and 25 assists in 47 games.

Professional
On February 14, 2013, Bennett was called up to the NHL from Pittsburgh's American Hockey League (AHL) affiliate, the Wilkes-Barre/Scranton Penguins. He played in his first career NHL game against the Winnipeg Jets on February 15. On February 24, he scored his first career NHL goal, on the power play, against Tampa Bay Lightning goaltender Mathieu Garon. Bennett's play during the regular season earned him a spot in the starting lineup for the Penguins' first game in the 2013 Stanley Cup playoffs. He scored a power play goal in his first-ever playoff game, coming against New York Islanders goaltender Evgeni Nabokov on May 1.

During the 2013–14 season, Bennett's year was interrupted due to a broken wrist he suffered whilst playing against the Islanders on November 22, 2013, in Pittsburgh. He had surgery the following week and returned to the lineup four months later on March 28, 2014, in a game against the Columbus Blue Jackets, where he scored the game-winning goal in a 2–1 Penguins victory.

On June 12, 2016, Bennett became the first California born-and-trained player to become a Stanley Cup champion as part of the Penguins' 2016 Stanley Cup championship over the San Jose Sharks. He played 33 games for the Penguins in the 2015–16 season, and one playoff game due to injuries. He did not meet the requirements to have his name placed on the Stanley Cup.

On June 25, 2016, Bennett was traded to the New Jersey Devils in exchange for the Detroit Red Wings' third-round draft pick in the 2016 NHL Entry Draft.

As a free agent after his lone season with the Devils, Bennett signed a one-year, $650,000 contract with the St. Louis Blues on July 1, 2017. In the following 2017–18 season, after attending the Blues' training camp, Bennett was placed on waivers and reassigned to begin the year with the club's AHL affiliate, the Chicago Wolves. He was later recalled and appeared in six scoreless games with St. Louis before returning to finish with 57 points in 60 games with the Wolves.

In the off-season, as a restricted free agent, Bennett opted to halt his North American career after agreeing to a one-year contract with Belarusian club Dinamo Minsk of the Kontinental Hockey League (KHL) on July 6, 2018. In the 2018–19 season, Bennett appeared in five games with Minsk, registering one assist before opting to mutually terminate his contract with the club on September 19, 2018.

Bennett returned to North America and sat out the remainder of the season. As a free agent on July 1, 2019, Bennett agreed to a one-year, two-way contract with the Arizona Coyotes organization. On June 26, 2021, Bennett announced his retirement.

Personal life
Bennett graduated from Valley Christian High School in Cerritos, California. He is the son of Kirk and Louanna Bennett. He also has three siblings: Wade, Shane and Bailey.

Bennett's nickname is "Sunshine" after the Remember the Titans character from the same state.

In order to be allowed to play hockey, Bennett's parents made him learn to play an instrument. Bennett chose piano, which he played from the age of 8 to 13.

Career statistics

Awards and honors

References

External links
 

1991 births
American men's ice hockey right wingers
Chicago Wolves players
Denver Pioneers men's ice hockey players
HC Dinamo Minsk players
Ice hockey players from California
Living people
Penticton Vees players
People from Gardena, California
National Hockey League first-round draft picks
New Jersey Devils players
Pittsburgh Penguins draft picks
Pittsburgh Penguins players
St. Louis Blues players
Stanley Cup champions
Tucson Roadrunners players
Wilkes-Barre/Scranton Penguins players